Reverse phase (RP) refer to :
 Reversed-phase chromatography, any chromatographic method that uses a non-polar stationary phase
 Reverse phase protein lysate microarray, a micro-cell lysate dot-blot that allows measurement of protein expression levels